Dharma Kshetram is a 1992 Telugu-language legal action film, produced by K. C. Reddy under the Sri Rajeev Productions banner and directed by A. Kodandarami Reddy. It stars Nandamuri Balakrishna, Divya Bharati and music composed by Ilaiyaraaja. The film was not commercially successful.

Plot 
The film begins in a city that is in jeopardy of a political war between two dreadful goons Durga Prasad and Pandu. The two weasels intrude and flaw the students' union politics in which Prabhakar’s sibling Pandu is butchered by Durga Prasad’s brother Sambhu Prasad. A lecturer Bharati witnesses the crime and prepares to testify. Amid, her kid brother Nagaraju sidekick of Durga Prasad obstructs her. Nevertheless, she stands firm and is assaulted by rotters near the court premises. Advocate Banerjee a rectitude & rebel shields Bharati and succeeds in forfeiting the culprits. He has an ideal family his sister, and brother-in-law serve as SP. He crushes on a charming Maithili daughter of a Judge. But unfortunately, his younger one Kiran is clutched by Pandu’s gang. 

Currently, as an avenge, Sambhu Prasad molests & kills Bharati when Nagaraju rages and slaughters him, he too severely wounded. Here, Benerjee tactically makes with one-on-one side the two black hats to simply put cases. Particularly, Pandu murdered Sambhu Prasad. Further, Nagaraju is covered by Pandu who forces him to state that Durga Prasad stabbed him. At trial, they guilefully abscond by mingling together. As of today, the party's high command allows Durga Prasad to compete in Mayor elections. 

So, Banerjee catches hold of Nagaraju, builds a new case to disable Durga Prasad, and is apprehended. Despite that, he is acquitted as innocent of scandalous conduct by Pandu and wiping out Nagaraju. At election time, Kiran is powerless to resist and is outraged when he is slain. At this point, Banerjee pledges to impede their anarchies and starts his murder spree. Step by step, he slaughters all acolytes of Durga Prasad including Pandu outside the law in self-defense. Now Durga Prasad enrages seizes and severely tortures Banerjee. Next, he triumphs in elections. At last, Banerjee onslaughts while his oathing ceremony and ceases him. Finally, the movie ends with Benerjee surrendering before the judiciary.

Cast

Nandamuri Balakrishna as Advocate Banerjee
Divya Bharati as Maithili
Jaggayya as Judge
Nassar as S.P.
Rami Reddy as Durga Prasad
Devan as Pandu
Srihari as Sobhanadri
Brahmaji as Sambhu Prasad
Sakshi Ranga Rao as Madhava Rao
Prasanna Kumar as Prabhakar
Posani Krishna Murali as Citizen
Jayalalita as Lawyer Kamakshi
Jyothi as Banerjee's Sister
Sudha Rani as Bharathi
Radhabai as Banerjee's grandmother

Soundtrack

Music composed by Ilaiyaraaja. Music released on LEO Audio Company. The song "Enno Ratrulosthayi" was taken from Ilaiyaraja's own song, "Maasimaasam" from the Tamil film Dharma Durai (1991). The song was remixed by Ghibran for Amigos (2023).

Telugu version (Original Motion Soundtrack)

References

External links

1992 films
Films scored by Ilaiyaraaja
Films directed by A. Kodandarami Reddy
1990s Telugu-language films